Mission High School is a secondary school located in Mission, Texas.  It is a part of the Mission Consolidated Independent School District.

It serves sections of Mission, Palmhurst, and Alton, as well as the Mission CISD portion of the unincorporated area of West Sharyland.

Tom Landry

For many years, Mission High School was the city's only high school. As of 2011, it competed in the 5-A Texas classification was home to some 2,200 students. At its peak, it was home to over 4,000 students before MCISD split the Mission High School attendance zone into two, with the addition of Veterans Memorial High School.

Mission High students were victims of the September 21, 1989 Alton, Texas bus crash; the students' school bus, also carrying students to Mission Junior High, fell into a caliche pit after a collision with a truck, causing 21 deaths.

References

External links
Mission High School

Mission, Texas
High schools in Hidalgo County, Texas
Public high schools in Texas